The self-consistency principle was established by Rolf Hagedorn in 1965 to explain the thermodynamics of fireballs in high energy physics collisions. A thermodynamical approach to the high energy collisions first proposed by E. Fermi.

Partition function
The partition function of the fireballs can be written in two forms, one in terms of its density of states, and the other in terms of its mass spectrum, .

The self-consistency principle says that both forms must be asymptotically equivalent for energies or masses sufficiently high (asymptotic limit). Also, the density of states and the mass spectrum must be asymptotically equivalent in the sense of the weak constraint proposed by Hagedorn as

.

These two conditions are known as the self-consistency principle or bootstrap-idea. After a long mathematical analysis Hagedorn was able to prove that there is in fact  and   satisfying the above conditions, resulting in

and

.

Then the asymptotic partition function is given by

where a singularity is clearly observed for  →. This singularity determines the limiting temperature  in Hagedorn's theory, which is also known as Hagedorn temperature.

Hagedorn was able not only to give a simple explanation for the thermodynamical aspect of high energy particle production, but also worked out a formula for the hadronic mass spectrum and predicted the limiting temperature for hot hadronic systems.

After some time this limiting temperature was shown by N. Cabibbo and G. Parisi to be related to a phase transition, which characterizes by the deconfinement of quarks at high energies. The mass spectrum was further analyzed by Steven Frautschi.

Q-exponential function
The Hagedorn theory was able to describe correctly the experimental data from collision with center-of-mass energies up to approximately 10 GeV, but above this region it failed. In 2000 I. Bediaga, E. M. F. Curado and J. M. de Miranda proposed a phenomenological generalization of Hagedorn's theory by replacing the exponential function that appears in the partition function by the q-exponential function from the Tsallis non-extensive statistics. With this modification the generalized theory was able again to describe the extended experimental data.

In 2012 A. Deppman proposed a non-extensive self-consistent thermodynamical theory that includes the self-consistency principle and the non-extensive statistics. This theory gives as result the same formula proposed by Bediaga et al., which describes correctly the high energy data, but also new formulas for the mass spectrum and density of states of fireball. It also predicts a new limiting temperature and a limiting entropic index.

References 

Particle physics
Nuclear physics
Principles